Pinki Virani (born January 30, 1959) is an Indian writer, journalist, human-rights activist and writer. She is the author of Once was Bombay, Aruna's Story, Bitter Chocolate: Child Sexual Abuse in India (which won the National Award), and Deaf Heaven. Her fifth book is called Politics of the Womb -- The Perils of Ivf, Surrogacy & Modified Babies.

Early life and education
Virani was born in Mumbai, India, 30 January 1959, to Gujarati Muslim parents. Her father owned a shop, and her mother was a teacher. She attended school in Mumbai, Pune and Mussoorie. She went to the US to study for a Masters in Journalism on the Aga Khan Foundation scholarship. She did an internship at The Sunday Times, where she reported extensively on the race riots in Britain.

Career
She started working as a typist at the age of 18. When she returned to India after her scholarship, she worked as a reporter and went on to become India's first woman editor of an evening paper. She moved from daily journalism when she published her first book.

Virani is the author of five books. 
Aruna's Story is about the rape of a nurse that left her in a coma. The book forms part of a 52-minute documentary, produced by the PSBT, titled 'Passive Euthanasia: Kahaani Karuna Ki'.Theatre director Arvind Gaur scripted and directed it as solo play 'Aruna's Story'. Solo act performed by Lushin Dubey
Bitter Chocolate is about child sexual abuse in India. A Solo play based on this book was scripted-directed by Arvind Gaur and performed by Lushin Dubey.
Once Was Bombay is a sociology book.
Deaf Heaven, her first work of fiction, experiments with form and style to warn off the danger of the tipping over of a modern country into neo-fascism.
In Politics Of The Womb – The Perils Of Ivf, Surrogacy & Modified Babies (2016), Virani criticises IVF and other forms of assisted reproduction when used on women in aggressively repetitive cycles and calls for a worldwide ban on commercial surrogacy and other forms of third-party assisted reproduction

Aruna Shanbaug case

In 2009, Pinki Virani filed a petition in Supreme Court of India on behalf of Aruna Shanbaug, a nurse working at the KEM Hospital in Mumbai on 27 November 1973 when she was sexually assaulted by a sweeper. During the attack, Shanbaug was strangled with a chain, and the deprivation of oxygen left her in a vegetative state. She was treated at KEM following the incident and was kept alive by a feeding tube for 42 years, until her death of pneumonia in 2015. In Virani's 2009 petition, she argued that the "continued existence of Aruna is in violation of her right to live in dignity". The Supreme Court made its decision on 7 March 2011. It rejected the plea to discontinue Aruna's life support but issued a set of broad guidelines legalising passive euthanasia in India. The Supreme Court also refused to recognise Virani as the "next friend" of Shanbaug, a description Virani had used to file the petition.

Personal life
She is married to Shankkar Aiyar, who is a journalist and the author of Accidental India.

Bibliography
 Aruna's Story: the true account of a rape and its aftermath. Viking, 1998.
 Bitter Chocolate: child sexual abuse in India, Penguin Books, 2000

 Deaf Heaven, HarperCollins Publishers India, 2009. .
 Politics Of The Womb—The Perils Of IVF, Surrogacy & Modified Babies, Penguin Random House, 2016.

References

External links
 SAWNET biography

Indian women journalists
1959 births
Living people
Writers from Mumbai
Columbia University Graduate School of Journalism alumni
Indian women non-fiction writers
Indian women activists
21st-century Indian Muslims
Gujarati people
Euthanasia activists
Indian activist journalists
Indian political writers
20th-century Indian non-fiction writers
20th-century Indian women writers
Indian women political writers
Journalists from Maharashtra
21st-century Indian women writers
21st-century Indian writers
21st-century Indian non-fiction writers
Women writers from Maharashtra
20th-century Indian journalists
Activists from Maharashtra